The Audio-Technica AT-LP120 is a mid-range direct-drive turntable introduced in 2009 by the Japanese audio equipment manufacturer Audio-Technica. The AT-LP120 was intended to be a viable replacement for the long-running Technics SL-1200 series of turntables that was set to be discontinued in 2010. It supports both phono and line-level output, using a built-in preamplifier.

The turntable also has the ability to dub records directly to a computer in real-time using a USB connection.

At the January 2019 Consumer Electronics Show, an updated version called the AT-LP120XUSB was announced by Audio Technica. According to the company, the new model includes an improved internal preamp and comes with the company's updated VM95E cartridge.

Similarities to the SL-1200
Since it was designed to mimic the Technics SL-1200 series of turntables, the AT-120 shares many design traits with the older Technics models, including:

 Metal construction
 Pop-up target light
 "S"-shaped tonearm
 Built-in strobe speed indicator
 Quartz speed lock

Specifications

References 

Products introduced in the 21st century
Turntables